
Zwoleń County is a unit of territorial administration and local government (powiat) in Masovian Voivodeship, east-central Poland. It came into being on January 1, 1999, as a result of the Polish local government reforms passed in 1998.

As of 2019 its total population is 36,222, out of which the population of Zwoleń is 7,698, and the rural population is 28,524.

Neighbouring counties
Zwoleń County is bordered by Kozienice County to the north, Puławy County to the east, Opole Lubelskie County to the south-east, Lipsko County to the south and Radom County to the west.

Administrative division
The county is subdivided into five gminas (one urban-rural and four rural). These are listed in the following table, in descending order of population.

Agriculture and cuisine
Zwoleń County is one of the main areas of strawberry cultivation in Poland, which is one of the main strawberry producers in Europe. Zwoleń strawberries and konfitura truskawkowa (a type of traditional Polish strawberry jam) are officially protected traditional foods of the area, as designated by the Ministry of Agriculture and Rural Development of Poland.

Transport
The National roads 12 and 79, and Voivodeship roads 733 and 787 pass through the county.

References

 
Land counties of Masovian Voivodeship